John Allen may refer to:

Academia
John Allen (historian) (1771–1843), Scottish historian and political writer
John Allen (bookseller) (1789–1829), English bookseller and antiquary
John S. Allen (1907–1982), American university president

Business and industry
John Allen (miner) (1775–?), English lead miner aboard HMS Investigator
John Allen (trade unionist) (1804–1888), Irish trade union leader
John Allen (saloon keeper) (1823–1870), American saloon keeper and underworld figure in New York City

Military
John Allen (soldier) (1771–1813), American Army officer killed in the War of 1812
John M. Allen (soldier) (died 1847), American soldier; first mayor of Galveston, Texas
John Allen (Irish nationalist) (died 1855), Irish nationalist and colonel in the French army
John R. Allen Jr. (born 1935), United States Air Force general
John R. Allen (born 1953), United States Marine Corps general
John J. Allen (general), United States Air Force general

Politics and law

New Zealand
John Southgate Allen (1883–1955), member of the New Zealand Legislative Council
John Manchester Allen (1901–1941), New Zealand politician
John Allen (diplomat) (fl. 2009–2011), Administrator of Tokelau

United Kingdom
John Allen, 1st Viscount Allen (1660–1726), Irish peer and politician
John Allen, 3rd Viscount Allen (1713–1745), Irish peer and politician
John Allen, 4th Viscount Allen (died 1753), Irish peer and politician
John Hensleigh Allen (1769–1843), English politician; Member of Parliament for Pembroke
Sir John Sandeman Allen (Liverpool West Derby MP) (1865–1935), British politician; Member of Parliament for Liverpool West Derby
John Sandeman Allen (Birkenhead West MP) (1892–1949), British politician; Member of Parliament for Birkenhead West

United States
John Allen (Connecticut politician) (1763–1812), U.S. Representative from Connecticut
John J. Allen (judge) (1797–1871), American jurist and U.S. Representative from Virginia
John W. Allen (1802–1887), American politician; mayor of Cleveland, Ohio
John Kirby Allen (1810–1838), American politician in the Texas House of Representatives; founder of Houston
John J. Allen (New York politician) (1842–1926), American politician in the New York State Assembly
John Howard Allen (1845–?), American politician; mayor of Orlando, Florida
John B. Allen (1845–1903), American politician; first U.S. Senator from Washington
John Mills Allen (1846–1917), U.S. Representative from Mississippi
John Clayton Allen (1860–1939), U.S. Representative from Illinois
John J. Allen Jr. (1899–1995), U.S. Representative from California
John Allen (Arizona politician), American politician and member of the Arizona House of Representatives

Other countries
John Campbell Allen (1817–1898), Canadian justice of the colonial New Brunswick Supreme Court
John J. Allen (Canadian politician) (1871–1935), Canadian politician; mayor of Ottawa

Religion
John Allin (Puritan minister) (1596–1671), or Allen, English born Puritan cleric in Massachusetts
John Allen (minister) (1741/2–1780s), English Baptist minister who supported the independence of America
John Allen (religious writer) (1771–1839), English dissenting layman and religious writer
John Allen (archdeacon of Chester) (died 1695)
John Allen (archdeacon of Salop) (1810–1886), Welsh cleric
John Allen (provost of Wakefield) (1932–2015), English Anglican Provost of Wakefield Cathedral
John L. Allen Jr. (born 1965), American religion journalist

Science and medicine
John Allen (engineer) (born 1928), English engineer and plasma physicist
John Allen (physician) (c. 1660–1741), English physician and inventor
John F. Allen (biochemist) (born 1950), British biochemist
John F. Allen (physicist) (Jack Allen, 1908–2001), Canadian physicist who worked on superfluid helium
John P. Allen (born 1929), American ecologist and engineer; co-founder of the Biosphere 2 Center
John R. L. Allen (born 1932), British geologist
John Romilly Allen (1847–1907), British archaeologist
John T. Allen, Australian atmospheric scientist

Sports
John Allen (baseball) (1890–1967), American baseball player
Hap Allen (John Francis Allen Jr., 1900–1988), American baseball player
John Allen (athlete) (1926–2006), American Olympic athlete
John Allen (rugby union) (1942–2022), English rugby union player
John Allen (footballer, born 1955), English footballer
John Allen (hurler) (born 1955), English hurling player and manager
John Allen (footballer, born 1964), English footballer for Chester City and Mansfield Town
John Allen (American football) (fl. 1970s), American football coach
John Allen (sportsman, born 1974), Australian rugby union player and cricketer 
John Allen (basketball) (born 1982), American basketball player
John Allen (coach) (fl. 2000s–2010s), American football coach

Others
John Allen (pioneer) (1796–1851), American pioneer and co-founder of Ann Arbor, Michigan
John C. Allen (1907–1979), American roller coaster designer
John Whitby Allen (1913–1973), American pioneering model railroader
John Allen (murderer) (1934–2015), English criminal who murdered his wife and children
John P. Allen (musician), Canadian country, rock and bluegrass fiddler
John Allen (guitarist), member of The Nashville Teens

See also
Allen (surname)
Jack Allen (disambiguation)
John Allan (disambiguation)
Johnny Allen (disambiguation)
Jon Allen (disambiguation)
John Alen (1476–1534), English priest and canon lawyer
John Alleyn (disambiguation), including John Alleyne
John Allin (1921–1998), American Episcopalian bishop